This is a list of bands the play Nintendocore, a style of music that combines chiptune and video game music with various forms of hard rock, especially heavy metal and hardcore punk.

A
 The Advantage
 An Albatross
 Anamanaguchi

C
Crystal Castles

D
 The Depreciation Guild

E
 Enter Shikari

G
 Genghis Tron

H
 Hella
 Horse the Band

I
 I See Stars
 I Fight Dragons

K
 Karate High School

M
 Math the Band
 The Megas
 Minibosses

N
 The NESkimos

O
 The Octopus Project

P
 The Protomen
 Powerglove

R
 Rolo Tomassi

S
 Sky Eats Airplane

See also
 List of chiptune artists
 List of electronicore bands

References 

Lists of metalcore bands
Lists of heavy metal bands
Lists of hardcore punk bands